Eas Dubh (Gaelic for dark or black waterfall) is the name of a number of waterfalls in Scotland:

Eas Dubh, Glen Urquhart
Eas Dubh, Glen Affric
Eas Dubh, Menteith Hills
Eas Dubh, Mull
Eas Dubh, River Lonan
Eas Dubh, Ullapool
Eas Dubh Gleann Tanagaidh
Eas Dubh Uidh a’ Chlaigeil
Eas Dubh a’Ghlinne Ghairbh